Ford Airport  is a county-owned public-use airport in Dickinson County, Michigan, United States. It is located three miles west of the central business district of Iron Mountain, in the central Upper Peninsula of Michigan. The airport offers scheduled passenger service by one commercial airline, SkyWest Airlines, an affiliate of Delta Connection, which is subsidized by the Essential Air Service program. It is also a hub for FedEx Feeder operator CSA Air.

Ford Airport serves the greater Dickinson County area, which includes the cities of Iron Mountain, Kingsford and Norway in Michigan and the bordering Wisconsin communities of Aurora, Florence and Niagara. Its service area also includes portions of Iron and Menominee counties in Michigan and Florence and Marinette counties in Wisconsin.
 
It is included in the Federal Aviation Administration (FAA) National Plan of Integrated Airport Systems for 2021–2025, in which it is categorized as a non-hub primary commercial service facility.

The Experimental Aircraft Association (EAA) hosts events for community members, most notably Ford Airport Days. They often feature restored warbirds like B-25 Mitchell bombers and A-26 Invaders. The event also gives people the opportunity to fly drones, hosts tributes to veterans, and develops interest in aviation among youth.

The airport received $1,000,000 from the US Department of Transportation in 2020 as part of the CARES Act to help it mitigate the effects of the covid-19 pandemic.

Facilities and Aircraft 
Ford Airport covers an area of 720 acres (291 ha) at an elevation of 1,182 feet (360 m). It has two asphalt paved runways: 1/19 is 6,501 by 150 feet and 13/31 is 3,808 by 75 feet. Runway 1/19 
has approved ILS, GPS and LOC/DME approaches. In addition, the Iron Mountain VOR/DME (IMT) navigational facility is located at the field.

In 2022, Dickinson County started considering a renovation of the terminal at Ford in hopes to hosting larger aircraft. A consultant has been hired to help the airport plan.

For the 12-month period ending December 31, 2018, the airport had 6,966 aircraft operations, an average of 19 per day: 62% air taxi, 21% commercial service and 17% general aviation. In December 2022, there were 33 aircraft based at this airport: 22 single-engine, 8 multi-engine, 2 jet and 1 helicopter. Both based and transient general aviation aircraft are supported by the fixed-base operator (FBO) Kubick Aviation Services, which  offers aviation fuel, aircraft parking and hangars, aircraft rental, courtesy cars, pilot lounges, snooze rooms, and more.

Ford Airport enhances regional air travel safety by maintaining an Aircraft Rescue 
and Firefighting (ARFF) 'Index A' trained team and related equipment.

Airline and destinations

Passenger

Top destinations

Cargo operations

Accidents & Incidents
On July 27, 1965, a Beechcraft 65 Queen Air crashed while attempting to land at Iron Mountain. The crew voluntarily shut down one engine to simulate a failure, but the aircraft had insufficient speed to maintain flight and crashed short of the runway. Both occupants received minor injuries.
On July 3, 1974, a Beechcraft Model 18 crashed on approach to Iron Mountain. The pilot encountered poor visibility on approach and descended to look for the runway when he struck a bank. Factors contributing to the crash were a failure to initiate a go-around, an incorrect altimeter setting, runway misalignment, and weather worse than forecasted.
On October 17, 1974, a Beechcraft Model 18 impacted terrain short of the runway while attempting to land. The pilot descended below the Minimum Descent Altitude on an instrument approach. The sole pilot onboard was killed. The aircraft was operated by the same company as the Model 18 that crashed earlier in the year.
On January 6, 2000, a Beechcraft Travel Air en route to Ford crashed south of the airport. The airplane was reported on the airports ILS when the pilot reported moderate rime icing to air traffic controllers. The pilot received fatal injuries. The accident's probable cause was found to be the pilot's failure to maintain proper glidepath and obstacle clearance. Contributing factors were found to be dark nighttime conditions, airframe icing, flight into adverse weather, and conditions conducive to pilot fatigue.
On August 3, 2021, a Cessna 172 Skyhawk was substantially damage by the jet blast of a Bombardier CRJ-200 parked nearby. The Skyhawk passed 200 feet behind the jet while mechanics increased engine power for a maintenance test. The blast from the jet lifted the 172's tail, resulting in substantial damage to the left wing and strut.
On December 25, 2021, a Lancair IV-P crashed after takeoff from Ford. The pilot, who, along with one passenger, received minor injuries, said there was a starter generator failure annunciator on climbout. The pilot troubleshot the issue, but the engine eventually lost all power, and the pilot was forced to land off-airport. The accident is under investigation.

References

Other sources 

 Essential Air Service documents (Docket Number OST-1999-5175) from the U.S. Department of Transportation:
 2005-5-14 Order Selecting Carrier and Setting Final Subsidy Rate
 Order 2007-3-21 Selecting Carrier and Setting Final Subsidy Rates
 2008-1-13 Order Selecting Carrier, Setting Final Subsidy Rates and Requesting Proposals
 2008-8-14 Order Reselecting Carrier and Setting Final Subsidy Rates
 2010-6-4 Order Re-Selecting Carrier, Setting Final Subsidy Rates and Requesting Proposals
 2011-11-30 Order Selecting Carrier

External links 
   from Michigan Airport Directory
   from Wisconsin Airport Directory
 Superior Aviation
 
 

Airports in Michigan
Essential Air Service
Buildings and structures in Dickinson County, Michigan
Transportation in Dickinson County, Michigan
Airports in the Upper Peninsula of Michigan